Man Descending is the third album by Canadian singer-songwriter Justin Rutledge, released April 8, 2008 on Six Shooter Records.

Rutledge has stated to CBC Radio 3 that the album is titled for, and to an extent thematically inspired by, Guy Vanderhaeghe's short story collection Man Descending.

Track listing

References

2008 albums
Justin Rutledge albums
Six Shooter Records albums